Church of St Martin of Tours may refer to:

 Church of St Martin of Tours (San Martín del Rey Aurelio)
 St Martin of Tours' Church, Saundby
 St. Martin of Tours' Church (Bronx)